The 2022–23 Sydney Kings season was the 34th season of the franchise in the National Basketball League (NBL).

Roster

Standings

Ladder 

The NBL tie-breaker system as outlined in the NBL Rules and Regulations states that in the case of an identical win–loss record, the overall points percentage will determine order of seeding.

Ladder progression

Game log

NBL Blitz 

|-style="background:#FFBBBB;"
| 1
| 17 September
| @ Tasmania
| L 73–53
| Derrick Walton (12)
| Kouat Noi (10)
| Derrick Walton (4)
| Darwin Basketball Facility916
| 0–1
|-style="background:#BBF3BB;"
| 2
| 21 September
| S.E. Melbourne
| W 91–79
| Derrick Walton (15)
| Xavier Cooks (5)
| Biwali Bayles (4)
| Darwin Basketball Facility917
| 1–1
|-style="background:#BBF3BB;"
| 3
| 23 September
| @ New Zealand
| W 93–101
| Tim Soares (19)
| Xavier Cooks (9)
| Jackson Makoi (4)
| Darwin Basketball Facility905
| 2–1

Regular season 

|-style="background:#BBF3BB;"
| 1
| 1 October
| @ Illawarra
| W 97–106
| Derrick Walton (32)
| Justin Simon (9)
| Derrick Walton (8)
| WIN Entertainment Centre4,008
| 1–0
|-style="background:#BBF3BB;"
| 2
| 7 October
| Brisbane
| W 100–90
| Xavier Cooks (23)
| Xavier Cooks (11)
| Derrick Walton (8)
| Qudos Bank Arena11,478
| 2–0
|-style="background:#BBF3BB;"
| 3
| 9 October
| @ Melbourne
| W 71–91
| Xavier Cooks (23)
| Tim Soares (10)
| Derrick Walton (6)
| John Cain Arena7,881
| 3–0
|-style="background:#FFBBBB;"
| 4
| 14 October
| Cairns
| L 78–83
| Dejan Vasiljevic (20)
| Derrick Walton (9)
| Derrick Walton (6)
| Qudos Bank Arena7,287
| 3–1
|-style="background:#BBF3BB;"
| 5
| 16 October
| @ Brisbane
| W 85–102
| Justin Simon (23)
| Xavier Cooks (9)
| Xavier Cooks (9)
| Nissan Arena4,797
| 4–1
|-style="background:#FFBBBB;"
| 6
| 21 October
| Adelaide
| L 88–92
| Derrick Walton (23)
| Xavier Cooks (10)
| Derrick Walton (6)
| Qudos Bank Arena8,154
| 4–2
|-style="background:#BBF3BB;"
| 7
| 23 October
| @ Melbourne
| W 69–87
| Cooks, Soares (14)
| Xavier Cooks (10)
| Derrick Walton (8)
| John Cain Arena10,300
| 5–2
|-style="background:#BBF3BB;"
| 8
| 29 October
| Cairns
| W 106–103
| Xavier Cooks (18)
| Xavier Cooks (12)
| Xavier Cooks (8)
| Qudos Bank Arena7,282
| 6–2

|-style="background:#BBF3BB;"
| 9
| 6 November
| @ New Zealand
| W 77–81
| Cooks, Simon (13)
| Tim Soares (8)
| Derrick Walton (5)
| Spark Arena4,484
| 7–2
|-style="background:#BBF3BB;"
| 10
| 20 November
| Illawarra
| W 83–82
| Angus Glover (13)
| Justin Simon (8)
| Derrick Walton (7)
| Qudos Bank Arena11,032
| 8–2
|-style="background:#FFBBBB;"
| 11
| 28 November
| @ Cairns
| L 94–88 (OT)
| Xavier Cooks (25)
| Xavier Cooks (10)
| Bruce, Walton (5)
| Cairns Convention Centre3,636
| 8–3

|-style="background:#BBF3BB;"
| 12
| 4 December 
| Adelaide
| W 97–78
| Tim Soares (18)
| Xavier Cooks (7)
| Derrick Walton (11)
| Qudos Bank Arena9,389
| 9–3
|-style="background:#BBF3BB;"
| 13
| 8 December 
| @ New Zealand
| W 81–88
| Derrick Walton (21)
| Xavier Cooks (11)
| Bruce, Cooks (5)
| Spark Arena3,454
| 10–3
|-style="background:#FFBBBB;"
| 14
| 11 December
| Tasmania
| L 76–84
| Derrick Walton (21)
| Xavier Cooks (8)
| Xavier Cooks (5)
| Qudos Bank Arena7,321
| 10–4
|-style="background:#BBF3BB;"
| 15
| 16 December
| @ Illawarra
| W 79–86
| Xavier Cooks (21)
| Cooks, Soares (9)
| Derrick Walton (9)
| WIN Entertainment Centre3,288
| 11–4
|-style="background:#FFBBBB;"
| 16
| 18 December
| @ S.E. Melbourne
| L 113–112 (2OT)
| Derrick Walton (45)
| Justin Simon (9)
| Derrick Walton (10)
| Gippsland Regional Indoor Stadium3,000
| 11–5
|-style="background:#BBF3BB;"
| 17
| 25 December
| Melbourne
| W 101–80
| Xavier Cooks (24)
| Xavier Cooks (11)
| Xavier Cooks (7)
| Qudos Bank Arena7,012
| 12–5
|-style="background:#BBF3BB;"
| 18
| 30 December
| Tasmania
| W 97–77
| Xavier Cooks (23)
| Cooks, Vasiljevic (7)
| Derrick Walton (7)
| Qudos Bank Arena12,467
| 13–5

|-style="background:#BBF3BB;"
| 19
| 4 January
| S.E. Melbourne
| W 118–102
| Dejan Vasiljevic (42)
| Xavier Cooks (7)
| Dejan Vasiljevic (5)
| Qudos Bank Arena11,321
| 14–5
|-style="background:#BBF3BB;"
| 20
| 7 January
| Perth
| W 108–87
| Xavier Cooks (24)
| Xavier Cooks (11)
| Bruce, Cooks, Vasiljevic (4)
| Qudos Bank Arena11,073
| 15–5
|-style="background:#BBF3BB;"
| 21
| 11 January
| @ Brisbane
| W 67–116
| Cooks, Soares (20)
| Galloway, Soares (9)
| Xavier Cooks (8)
| Nissan Arena4,068
| 16–5
|-style="background:#BBF3BB;;"
| 22
| 15 January
| Illawarra
| W 84–79
| Derrick Walton (19)
| Xavier Cooks (9)
| Derrick Walton (7)
| Qudos Bank Arena12,986
| 17–5
|-style="background:#FFBBBB;"
| 23
| 20 January
| @ Perth
| L 111–104
| Dejan Vasiljevic (26)
| Xavier Cooks (9)
| Xavier Cooks (8)
| RAC Arena13,038
| 17–6
|-style="background:#FFBBBB;"
| 24
| 22 January
| New Zealand
| L 88–93
| Derrick Walton (17)
| Derrick Walton (6)
| Cooks, Walton (4)
| Qudos Bank Arena14,232
| 17–7
|-style="background:#BBF3BB;"
| 25
| 27 January
| @ Tasmania
| W 77–91
| Dejan Vasiljevic (24)
| Angus Glover (7)
| Bruce, Walton (4)
| MyState Bank Arena4,293
| 18–7
|-style="background:#BBF3BB;"
| 26
| 29 January
| S.E. Melbourne
| W 111–106
| Derrick Walton (22)
| Xavier Cooks (10)
| Xavier Cooks (10)
| Qudos Bank Arena13,273
| 19–7

|-style="background:#FFBBBB;"
| 27
| 3 February
| @ Adelaide 
| L 115–108
| Tim Soares (24)
| Simon, Soares (7)
| Derrick Walton (13)
| Adelaide Entertainment Centre9,558
| 19–8
|-style="background:#FFBBBB;"
| 28
| 5 February
| @ Perth
| L 96–84
| Dejan Vasiljevic (18)
| Glover, Vasiljevic (7)
| Shaun Bruce (7)
| RAC Arena12,712
| 19–9

Postseason 

|-style="background:#BBF3BB;"
| 1
| 15 February 
| Cairns
| W 95–87
| Xavier Cooks (27)
| Xavier Cooks (14)
| Derrick Walton (5)
| Qudos Bank Arena7,367
| 1–0
|-style="background:#FFBBBB;"
| 2
| 17 February 
| @ Cairns
| L 93–82
| Derrick Walton (22)
| Justin Simon (10)
| Derrick Walton (6)
| Cairns Convention Centre4,626
| 1–1
|-style="background:#BBF3BB;"
| 3
| 19 February 
| Cairns
| W 79–64
| Dejan Vasiljevic (15)
| Cooks, Noi (11)
| Derrick Walton (9)
| Qudos Bank Arena7,123
| 2–1

|-style="background:#FFBBBB;"
| 4
| 3 March
| New Zealand
| L 87–95
| Justin Simon (18)
| Justin Simon (6)
| Derrick Walton (6)
| Qudos Bank Arena13,145
| 2–2
|-style="background:#BBF3BB;"
| 5
| 5 March
| @ New Zealand
| W 74–81
| Kouat Noi (20)
| Jordan Hunter (10)
| Shaun Bruce (3)
| Spark Arena8,429
| 3–2
|-style="background:#BBF3BB;"
| 6
| 10 March
| New Zealand
| W 91–68
| Dejan Vasiljevic (15)
| Xavier Cooks (8)
| Derrick Walton (9)
| Qudos Bank Arena18,049
| 4–2
|-style="background:#FFBBBB;"
| 7
| 12 March
| @ New Zealand
| L 80–70
| Derrick Walton (18)
| Justin Simon (7)
| Derrick Walton (4)
| Spark Arena9,742
| 4–3
|-style="background:#BBF3BB;"
| 8
| 15 March
| New Zealand
| W 77–69
| Derrick Walton (21)
| Xavier Cooks (11)
| Derrick Walton (6)
| Qudos Bank Arena18,124
| 5–3

Transactions

Re-signed

Additions

Subtractions

Awards

Club awards 
 Members Player of the Year: Xavier Cooks 
 Coaches Award: Tim Soares
 Player's Player: Xavier Cooks 
 Defensive Player: Justin Simon
 Hard Work Award: Kouat Noi
 Club Person of the Year: Chris Ohlback
 Club MVP: Xavier Cooks

See also 
 2022–23 NBL season
 Sydney Kings

References

External links 

 Official Website

Sydney Kings
Sydney Kings seasons
Sydney Kings season